The 2012–13 Kentucky Wildcats men's basketball team represented the University of Kentucky in the 2012–13 college basketball season. The team's head coach was John Calipari, who was in his fourth season. They played their home games at Rupp Arena and were members of the Southeastern Conference. They finished the season 21–12, 12–6 in SEC play to finish in a three-way tie for second place. They lost in the quarterfinals of the SEC tournament to Vanderbilt. They were invited to the 2013 NIT where they lost in the first round to Robert Morris.

Pre-season

Departures

Class of 2012 signees

Class of 2013 commitments

Class of 2014 commitments

Roster

Depth chart

Schedule and results

|-
!colspan=12 style="background:#005DAA; color:white;"| Exhibition

|-
!colspan=12 style="background:#005DAA; color:white;"| Non-conference regular season

|-
!colspan=12 style="background:#005DAA; color:white;"| SEC regular season
|-

|-
!colspan=12 style="background:#005DAA;"| SEC Tournament

|-
!colspan=12 style="background:#005DAA;"| National Invitation Tournament

Rankings

External links
ESPN info
Official website 

Kentucky
Kentucky Wildcats men's basketball seasons
Kentucky
Kentucky Wildcats
Kentucky Wildcats